Samuel Rosa Gonçalves (born February 25, 1991) is a Brazilian footballer who plays as a striker.

Club career
Samuel began his youth career with São José. He was discovered by Internacional and joined the club in 2010. In April 2011 he was transferred to Fluminense. He made his professional debut for Fluminense during the 2012 Campeonato Brasileiro Série A and scored five goals in 23 league appearances as the club won its fourth national title. That same year he made five appearances in the 2012 Campeonato Carioca, helping the club to that title, the club's 31st state championship. The following season Samuel made 45 appearances in all competitions scoring 9 goals, which included 8 matches during the Copa Libertadores. Samuel was close to joining La Liga's Espanyol during the 2013 summer transfer period, however, Fluminense was not able to reach a deal with the Spanish side. In January 2014, Samuel was acquired on loan by Major League Soccer club Los Angeles Galaxy. On March 12, 2014 Samuel scored his first goal for Galaxy at home against Mexican side Club Tijuana in the first leg of a CONCACAF Champions League tie, Samuel's effort proved to be the only goal as Galaxy defeated the Xolos 1-0.  On July 10, 2014, LA Galaxy terminated Samuel's loan agreement.

References

External links
video highlights of Samuel from his time in Brazil
Samuel at playmakerstats.com (English version of ogol.com.br)
 

Living people
1991 births
Brazilian footballers
Brazilian expatriate footballers
Expatriate soccer players in the United States
Campeonato Brasileiro Série A players
Major League Soccer players
UAE Pro League players
K League 1 players
Thai League 1 players
Association football forwards
Fluminense FC players
LA Galaxy players
Goiás Esporte Clube players
Sport Club do Recife players
Hatta Club players
Al-Nasr SC (Dubai) players
Fujairah FC players
Jeonbuk Hyundai Motors players
Samuel Rosa Goncalves
Samuel Rosa Goncalves
Samuel Rosa Goncalves
Expatriate footballers in the United Arab Emirates
Expatriate footballers in South Korea
Brazilian expatriate sportspeople in the United Arab Emirates
Brazilian expatriate sportspeople in South Korea